World Scientific Publishing is an academic publisher of scientific, technical, and medical books and journals headquartered in Singapore. The company was founded in 1981. It publishes about 600 books annually, along with 135 journals in various fields. In 1995, World Scientific co-founded the London-based Imperial College Press together with the Imperial College of Science, Technology and Medicine.

Company structure 
The company head office is in Singapore. The Chairman and Editor-in-Chief is Dr Phua Kok Khoo, while the Managing Director is Doreen Liu. The company was co-founded by them in 1981.

Imperial College Press 
In 1995 the company co-founded Imperial College Press, specializing in engineering, medicine and information technology, with Imperial College London. In 2006, World Scientific assumed full ownership of Imperial College Press, under a license granted by the university. Finally, in August 2016, ICP was fully incorporated into World Scientific under the new imprint, World Scientific Europe.

Awards 
A book World Scientific published, Lim Siong Guan's The Leader, The Teacher & You (2013), co-won the Singapore Literature Prize for English Non-fiction. The judges for the Singapore Literature Prize for Non-fiction were independent parties appointed by the Book Council.

See also 

 Journals published by World Scientific

References

External links 
 
 

Academic publishing companies
Publishing companies established in 1981
Companies of Singapore